Gudmo Biyo Cas is a town located in the Sanaag region of Somaliland. It is the site of numerous archaeological structures and rock art.

The town is inhabited by the Bahsanbuur sub-division of the Habr Je'lo clan, part of the wider Isaaq clan-family.

See also

References 

Populated places in Sanaag
Archaeological sites of Eastern Africa